Kremlin-Bicêtre United is a futsal club based in Kremlin-Bicêtre, France. The club was founded in 2002, played in the Championnat de France de Futsal.

Honours
 2004: Champion of Ile-de-France series 2
 2004: Winner's Cup in Val-de-Marne
 2006: Participated in the final phase of the National Cup (semi-finalist: 4th)
 2007: Vice-champion of the Ile-de-France Series 1
 2007: Semi-finalist in Paris cut
 2007: Semi-finalist Cup Val de Marne
 2008: Participated in the final phase of the National Cup (Finalist: 2nd)
 2008: Semi-finalist of the first National Challenge (3rd)
 2008: Champion of Ile-de-France Series 1
 2008: Winner of the Coupe de Paris
 2010: Championnat de France

References
 uefa.com

Externan link
Official Website

Futsal clubs in France
Sport in Val-de-Marne
Futsal clubs established in 2002
2002 establishments in France